Spring Lake is a lake in Alberta. It is located within the village of Spring Lake. Both are surrounded by Parkland County.

See also
List of lakes of Alberta

Spring Lake